Tejgaon Airport  is a Bangladesh Air Force military base in Dhaka, Bangladesh.  It served as the country's sole international airport prior to the construction of Hazrat Shahjalal International Airport.

History
The British had built military airstrips at Tejgaon, Dhaka during the Second World War for operating warplanes towards the Battle of Kohima and other Burmese war threats. After independence in 1947, Tejgaon Airport became the first airport to operate civil aviation in the then-East Pakistan and it was also a station of the Pakistan Air Force. A number of other British-built military airstrips in Bangladeshi territory were also converted into civil airports – some during the East Pakistan period and some after independence. A few others were converted to STOL (Short Take-off and Landing) ports some years ago. And some are still left alone. The airstrips not yet converted to any civil airport of any kind are at Feni, Rajendrapur, Pahar Kanchanpur, Chakaria and Rasulpur.

Soon after the Second World War broke out, the British authority felt the need to build Royal Indian Air Force (RIAF) stations in Dhaka and other vulnerable places in Bangladeshi territory. The construction of Tejgaon Airport at Dainodda started in 1941; and the building of a landing strip at Kurmitola (Balurghat) started at about the same time. The airstrips at Tejgaon and Kurmitola had military fighter plane landing facilities and the British Royal Air Force used the airstrips for maintenance and storage of their aircraft. There was also a United States Air Force detachment during the war. The first RIAF light fighter landed on the under‑construction runway of Tejgaon at the beginning of 1943 and after the development of the airport facilities, it became the first civil airport of Bangladesh. Today it is a part of BAF (Bangladesh Air Force) Base Bashar.

Following the transfer of civilian flights to the newly built Shahjalal International Airport in 1981, Tejgaon was taken under the control of the Bangladesh Air Force.

In mid-2011, the Bangladesh Air Force raised objections to a proposed 19-metre high metro rail along Bijoy Sarani, arguing that the metro rail would hinder military air operations from the Tejgaon airstrip, it made a plea that the airfield be kept functional. The BAF also recommended an alternative route along Khamarbari-Farmgate which would affect the Jatiya Sangsad Bhaban complex. The prime minister opted for the realignment of the route along the parliament complex in line with the BAF suggestion, a move which drew huge flak from different technical experts. The experts, among whom are architects, planners and civic activists, termed the BAF stance unfounded on many occasions and strongly argued that the metro rail would not affect the present operations of the airfield. The airstrip hasn't been used since 1988 and it is seriously affecting Dhaka city's development.

Between 16 and 17 October 2011, the CAAB quietly upgraded it from a short take-off and landing (STOL) port to a domestic airport. This increased the importance of the airport. The CAAB had declared this on their website, however, its website details on navigational aides, air traffic service and aeronautical communications for air operations in Bangladesh territory didn't mention Tejgaon airfield as an airport. A domestic airport requires all the technical features and passenger services as an international airport as per rules of the International Civil Aviation Organisation but the Tejgaon Airport does not have the services required for a STOL port.

Former airlines and destinations (before 1981)

Passenger

See also
List of airports in Bangladesh

References

Civil Aviation Authority, Bangladesh <http://www.caab.gov.bd/secfiles/earlyhis.html>

External links

Bangladesh Air Force
Airports established in 1943
Airfields of the United States Army Air Forces in British India
Buildings and structures in Dhaka
Defunct airports in Bangladesh
1981 disestablishments in Bangladesh
Airports disestablished in 1981
1943 establishments in India